Emergency Call is a 1952 British drama film  directed by Lewis Gilbert and stars Jack Warner in a familiar role playing a policeman, Anthony Steel, Joy Shelton and Sid James as a dubious boxing promoter.

It was shot at Nettlefold Studios and distributed by Butcher's Film Service. The sets were designed by the art director Bernard Robinson. The film was a noted success compared to its small budget and helped establish Gilbert as a director. It was remade in 1962 as Emergency starring Glyn Houston.

Synopsis
The film centres around a race against the clock to locate three blood donors each able to donate one pint of a rare type of blood to save the life of a young girl suffering from leukaemia. The doctor in charge of treating the girl enlists the assistance of police officer Inspector Lane in order to assist in the search for suitable donors. The three donors are each from very different backgrounds, a white boxer, a black sailor, and finally a murderer who has been on the run from the police for a number of years. The boxer's donation is fairly straightforward, having only to avoid his manager, the sailor's donation is more complicated, following a war-time incident where a dying Nazi soldier refused to accept his offer of a donation which he attributes to racism, he initially refuses to donate, until it is explained to him that the Nazi officer refused his donation for reasons that can be attributed to the Nazi's master race ideology.

The final donor is a murderer on the run from the police, living under an assumed name. The police eventually locate the man and he suffers a gunshot injury. He must choose to donate the last pint of blood needed and die at the scene from blood loss, or to refuse to donate in order to receive treatment in hospital but with the knowledge he will surely be found guilty of murder at trial and sentenced to death. The criminal chooses to donate and the young girl survives.

Cast

 Jack Warner as Inspector Lane
 Anthony Steel as Dr. Carter
 Joy Shelton as Laura Bishop
 Sid James as Danny Marks
 Earl Cameron as George Robinson
 John Robinson as Dr. Braithwaite
 Thora Hird as Mrs. Cornelius
 Eric Pohlmann as Flash Harry
 Sydney Tafler as Brett
 Geoffrey Hibbert as Jackson
 Henry Hewitt as Mr. Wilberforce
 Vida Hope as Brenda
 Avis Scott as Marie
 Freddie Mills as Tim Mahoney
 Peggy Bryan as Ward Sister
 Bruce Seton as Sergeant Bellamy 
 Anna Turner as Mrs. Jackson 
 Nosher Powell as Boy Booth 
 Campbell Singer as Sergeant Phillips 
 Nigel Clarke as Superintendent Travers
 Iris Vandeleur as Mrs. Flint

Production
Both Warner and Steel were loaned out from the Rank Organisation; the two men worked together again with Gilbert on Abert RN Real life boxer Freddie Mills played a boxer.

Release
Variety said "story strikes an original note."

The Monthly Film Bulletin said it "adds up to a fairly exciting ninety minutes."

Abner Greshler bought the rights to distribute the film in the US as The Hundred Hour Hunt. He also announced he signed Gilbert and Steel to make a film in Hollywood, The Black Robin. This did not eventuate.

References

External links
 
 
Emergency Call at TCMDB
Emergency Call at Letterbox DVD

1952 films
Films directed by Lewis Gilbert
British drama films
1952 drama films
Films shot at Nettlefold Studios
Butcher's Film Service films
Films set in London
British black-and-white films
1950s English-language films
1950s British films